The Hokkaido Former Aborigines Protection Act was a Japanese law enacted by the Imperial Diet in 1899 during the reign of Emperor Meiji. The law concerned the status of the indigenous Ainu people of Hokkaido, a population the Imperial government sought to forcibly assimilate.

Created under the pretense of protecting the Ainu people, organizations such as the Ainu Association of Hokkaido argue that the law served to confiscate Ainu land and destroy their traditional culture. According to a paper published in the Georgetown Journal of Asian Affairs, "The aim of [the law] was to 'civilize' and 'Japanize' the Ainu from 'barbarians' to 'primitive Japanese'.”

Background

Provisions and consequences

Land ownership and poverty 
Under the pretense of alleviating Ainu poverty, the legislation created individual land grants and promoted the adoption of Japanese agricultural practices over hunting. The legislation has been criticized as a means by which the Imperial government forcibly confiscated Ainu lands and impeded traditional Ainu culture. The land allotted to Ainu farmers was generally of poorer quality than that received by Japanese settlers in Hokkaido.

Cultural impact 
The law prohibited the Ainu from speaking their native language or practicing their traditional animistic religion. Through the legislation, Ainu children received "a rudimentary education in the Japanese language that focused on “national” ethics".

Legacy 
A 1993 survey found that the law was only mentioned in a minority of Japanese textbooks. Ainu activists consider the legislation to have helped facilitate the destruction of Ainu traditional customs to the benefit of Japanese settlers.

See also 

 Hokkaidō Colonization Office
 Natives Land Act, 1913 (South Africa)

References 
Japanese legislation
Ainu history
Settler colonialism
1899 in Japan
Cultural genocide